Abdul-Monem Rifai (ʻAbd al-Munʻim	Rifāʻī) (23 February 1917 – 17 October 1985) was a Jordanian diplomat and political figure of Palestinian descent, who served two non-consecutive terms as the 18th Prime Minister of Jordan in 1969 and 1970.

Life

Abdelmunim Al-Rifai was born in Safad, Palestine, the younger brother of Samir Al-Rifai. Rifai was Jordan's first Ambassador/Permanent Representative to the United Nations Headquarters in New York in 1956. Rifai was additionally one of Jordan's most prominent poets and penned the lyrics of the Jordanian National Anthem.

See also 
 List of prime ministers of Jordan

References

External links
 Prime Ministry of Jordan website

1917 births
1985 deaths
People from Tyre, Lebanon
Palestinians
Prime Ministers of Jordan
National anthem writers
Permanent Representatives of Jordan to the United Nations
Government ministers of Jordan
Foreign ministers of Jordan
Culture ministers of Jordan
Information ministers of Jordan
Deputy prime ministers of Jordan
Tourism ministers of Jordan
American University of Beirut alumni
Jordanian diplomats
Ambassadors of Jordan to the United States
Ambassadors of Jordan to Lebanon
Ambassadors of Jordan to the United Kingdom
Ambassadors of Jordan to Egypt
Ambassadors of Jordan to the Arab League
Members of the Senate of Jordan